LaVerdiere's Super Drug Stores (often called LaVerdiere's) was a pharmacy chain based in Waterville, Maine. At its peak, the company operated more than 70 stores in small towns throughout Maine, New Hampshire and Vermont. Aside from the pharmacy, the stores sold general items, as well as toys and Halloween and Christmas decorations. In the 1980s, some LaVerdiere's locations featured an arcade, called Action Family Arcade. LaVerdiere's operated 42 Action Family Arcades in the 1980s.

In 1994, Rite Aid purchased the company as part of its expansion into Northern New England. Company president Stephen LaVerdiere cited repeal of the state's blue laws as a factor making it more difficult to compete with national chains:

Evariste LaVerdiere founded the company on Main St., Waterville, Maine in 1922 with a news stand that grew into a soda fountain and later a drug store.

Rite Aid's successor in Maine, Walgreens, continues to operate in many of the former LaVerdiere's locations to this day.

In pop culture

LaVerdiere's, and its somewhat infamous Halloween goods aisle, were described in some detail in Stephen King's novella The Sun Dog:

See also
 List of defunct retailers of the United States

References

Rite Aid
Defunct pharmacies of the United States
1994 mergers and acquisitions
Health care companies based in Maine
Waterville, Maine